Felipe Saturnino Gomes (born 10 August 1995), known as Felipe Saturnino, is a Brazilian footballer who plays for Brasil de Pelotas as a left back.

Club career
Born in Rio de Janeiro, Felipe Saturnino finished his formation with Goiás. On 18 October 2014 he made his first team – and Série A – debut, starting in a 0–0 home draw against Grêmio.

In November Felipe Saturnino renewed his link with the club, until 2017.

References

External links
Felipe Saturnino at playmakerstats.com (English version of ogol.com.br)

1995 births
Living people
Footballers from Rio de Janeiro (city)
Brazilian footballers
Association football defenders
Campeonato Brasileiro Série A players
Goiás Esporte Clube players